Daniel Baker is the founder and CEO of FlightAware, a worldwide flight data and tracking company.  In the 1990s, he was a principal of distributed.net, which pioneered Internet distributed computing. Baker was the head of the systems department at NeoSoft, the first Internet provider in Texas during the early 1990s. He was also a founder and Vice President of Superconnect, an enterprise cable/telecom monitoring software company.

FlightAware
Baker started FlightAware in 2005 with no outside investments and the business produced over a million dollars of revenue in the first 18 months.

Other projects
Daniel Baker authored for Macmillan Computer Publishing's TCP/IP Unleashed book, published in 1999.

He was also the founder of the I Travel, You Travel community and network, which was sold to a social networking company for an undisclosed sum in 2006.

Baker is a member of the board of directors of the General Aviation Manufacturers Association and the Smithsonian Institution's National Air and Space Museum.

Personal 
Baker is a commercial pilot and lives in Houston, Texas.

References

External links 
 FlightAware Executive Profiles: Daniel Baker
 FlightAware

American aviators
Living people
Businesspeople from Houston
Businesspeople from Texas
American technology chief executives
American computer businesspeople
Commercial aviators
Year of birth missing (living people)